La Villuerca, also known as Risco de la Villuerca, Pico la Villuerca and Pico de las Villuercas is the highest peak of the Sierra de Villuercas range, also known as Sierra de Guadalupe. 

It is located 6 km west of Guadalupe town in Las Villuercas comarca, Cáceres Province, Extremadura, Spain and is the highest point of the greater Montes de Toledo system.

Description
La Villuerca has an elevation of 1,603 metres above sea level and is a conspicuous mountain that can be seen from quite a distance in the surrounding landscape.
This peak has an ancient name that has been documented since 1353 and it gives its name to Las Villuercas comarca. 

There is a narrow paved road leading to the mountaintop where there are abandoned military installations of the former Base Centro Táctico, CT2, Guadalupe-Villuercas with tall antennas and a heliport. The peak is often covered with snow in the winter.

References

External links 
 Geoparque de Las Villuercas
Villuercas (1.601 m)
Geography of the Province of Cáceres
Montes de Toledo
Mountains of Extremadura